Medicosma glandulosa is a species of shrub or small tree in the family Rutaceae and is endemic to far north Queensland. It has elliptical to egg-shaped leaves and flowers that are white with red tips or cream-coloured, borne singly or in small groups in leaf axils.

Description

Taxonomy
Medicosma glandulosa was first formally described in 1985 by Thomas Gordon Hartley in the Australian Journal of Botany from specimens collected by Bernard Hyland in 1975 in the Carbine logging area.

Distribution and habitat
It occurs from Mount Finnigan in the Cedar Bay National Park to near Mount Lewis in far north Queensland.

Conservation status
This species is classified as of "least concern" under the Queensland Government Nature Conservation Act 1992.

References

glandulosa
Sapindales of Australia
Flora of Queensland
Plants described in 1985
Taxa named by Thomas Gordon Hartley